Sepehr (meaning "sky") is an over-the-horizon radar (OTH) developed by Iran.
Little is known of the project, except it has a reported range of 3,000 km. It was originally scheduled to enter operational status in 2013. In August 2013, Iran announced completion of a first phase of the project with a range of only 300–700 km. In 2014 Iran announced it wished to establish a space-based radar system. It was expected to be finalised by the end of 2014. It is currently operational.

See also
 Russian Woodpecker
 Cobra Mist
 The Buzzer
 JORN
 Islamic Republic of Iran Air Defense Force Radar Systems

References

Ground radars
Military radars of Iran
Military equipment introduced in the 2010s